Shillingford a hamlet on the north bank of the River Thames in Warborough civil parish in South Oxfordshire, England.  Its homes are not quite with Warborough by way of one residential road.  It lies mostly on the A4074 between Oxford and Reading, at the junction with the A329.

History

Roads and ford
At various times the river crossing at Shillingford has been a ford, a ferry or a bridge. Shillingford Bridge was built in 1827, replacing a previous one built in 1767.  Neighbouring Wharf Road has a slipway, boathouse and 12 listed buildings (at Grade II), for their age predominantly), about half of its total. The river crossing has long made Shillingford a junction and coaching stop, just below the confluence of the River Thame:

The main NW-SE road between Oxford and Henley-on-Thames through Shillingford was a turnpike from 1736 until 1873. It became the A415 in 1922, renumbered to the A423 in the 1930s, and now forms part of the A4074.  The  bypasses around Dorchester and Sandford to the north were built in recent years.
The traditional road south rather than southeast, to Wallingford and over the bridge was a turnpike from 1764 to 1874.  In the early to late 20th century this was the main road between Reading and Oxford, part of the A42 when roads were first classified in 1922 then renumbered the A329 in 1935.  In 1993, when the Winterbrook Bridge enabled traffic to bypass Wallingford, the section between Wallingford and Shillingford was downgraded to become an unclassified road 
The road north between Aylesbury, Thame and Shillingford was a turnpike from 1770 until 1875.  It became the B4013, to be renumbered A329 when the M40 motorway was opened in the 1970s.

Notable residents
The Quaker minister Ann Crowley was born here in 1765
as was the artist and performer Vivian Stanshall in 1943.

Landmarks & Hotels 
As well as Wharf Road mentioned, Shillingford has a Guest House, the Kingfisher Inn.  Its bridge is in a medieval, simple style built in 1827.  It is Grade II* listed as is Bridge House nearby, as it is an authentic early Georgian structure. Hotels include the Shillingford Bridge Hotel, which is a three-star hotel by the Shillingford Bridge, but the hotel is not technically within Shillingford, as the hotel is on the opposite side of the river Thames from Shillingford and thus in the parish of Brightwell cum Sotwell.

References

Sources

Hamlets in Oxfordshire
Populated places on the River Thames